The Samolaco is a rare breed of horse originating from the Valchiavenna and Valtellina, in Lombardy, northern Italy. It takes its name from the town of Samolaco, near Chiavenna in the province of Sondrio. Gravely endangered, it is not among the fifteen indigenous horse "breeds of limited distribution" recognised by the AIA, the Italian breeders' association. The population is listed in DAD-IS as over 12 in 1994, and under 100 in 1998; one further example of the breed may have been identified during a television broadcast.

History

The Samolaco is thought to have originated from inter-breeding between indigenous animals and Spanish horses abandoned in about the seventeenth century by the garrisons of Spanish fortifications in the areas known as Trivio di Fuentes and Pian di Spagna, which were surrendered to Prince Eugène of Savoy in 1706. The FAO describes the breed as a composite of Andalusian and local populations. The horses were usually stabled during the winter and transhumed to higher alpine pasture in summer. Powerful Bruna Alpina oxen were preferred for agricultural and forestry work in the area, and the Samolaco was never widely distributed. Production of horsemeat was not economically attractive, and raising of the breed was largely abandoned. The few horses seen in the 1980s were gravely degenerated, with poorly conformed legs and heavy heads; their pale chestnut colouring may be attributed to the systematic introduction of Avelignese blood, which was at first a programme of improvement but effectively became one of outright substitution. The Samolaco is discussed in detail by Fogliata (1910):

References

Horse breeds
Horse breeds originating in Italy